Estrin (American English), or oestrin (British English), also known as estra-1,3,5(10)-triene, is an estrane steroid. It is dehydrogenated estrane with double bonds specifically at the C1, C3, and C5(10) positions. Estrin is a parent structure of the estrogen steroid hormones estradiol, estrone, and estriol, which have also been known as dihydroxyestrin, ketohydroxyestrin, and trihydroxyestrin, respectively.

Unlike its estrogen derivatives, estrin itself possesses minimal estrogenic activity, as hydroxyl and/or keto substitutions at the C3 and C17 positions are critical for high binding affinity to the estrogen receptors. Estrin has been found to be on the order of 1,000-fold less potent than estradiol in inducing estrogenic responses in vitro. In addition to estrin, estratrien-17β-ol, which lacks the 3-hydroxyl group of estradiol, and 3-hydroxyestratriene, which lacks the 17β-hydroxyl group of estradiol, both have measurable affinity for the estrogen receptor and are able to activate the receptor and induce progesterone receptor expression.

The term estrin is also a synonym for estrogen. It was coined by Sir Alan S. Parkes and C. W. Bellerby in 1926 to describe the hormone secreted from the ovaries that induces estrus in animals (i.e., estrogen).

See also
 1-Keto-1,2,3,4-tetrahydrophenanthrene

References

Estranes